Semitic studies, or Semitology, is the academic field dedicated to the studies of Semitic languages and literatures and the history of the Semitic-speaking peoples. A person may be called a Semiticist or a Semitist, both terms being equivalent.

It includes Assyriology, Arabic, Hebraist, Syriacist and Ethiopian studies, as well as comparative studies of Semitic languages aiming at the reconstruction of Proto-Semitic.

See also
Asian studies
African studies
Philology

Sources
Gotthelf Bergsträsser: Einführung in die semitischen Sprachen: Sprachproben und grammatische Skizzen, Nachdruck, Darmstadt 1993.
Carl Brockelmann: Grundriss der vergleichenden Grammatik der semitischen Sprachen, Bd. 1-2, 1908/1913.
David Cohen: Dictionnaire des racines sémitiques ou attestées dans les langues sémitiques.
Giovanni Garbini, Olivier Durand: Introduzione alle lingue semitiche (1994),  (review: Franz Rosenhal; The Journal of the American Oriental Society, Vol. 116, 1996).
Robert Hetzron (ed.): The Semitic Languages, London 1997.
Burkhart Kienast: Historische semitische Sprachwissenschaft, Wiesbaden 2001.

External links